The Czech Republic national under-19 football team is the national under-19 football team of the Czech Republic and is controlled by the Football Association of the Czech Republic. The team competes in the UEFA European Under-19 Championship, held every year. As of June 2011, their biggest achievement is third place in the UEFA European Under-19 Championships, which they have achieved on three occasions: 2003, 2006 and 2008.

Competitive record

UEFA European U-19 Championship record

*Draws include knockout matches decided by penalty shootout.
**Gold background colour indicates that the tournament was won. 
***Red border colour indicates tournament was held on home soil.

Players

Leading appearances

Note: Players in bold are still eligible to play for the team at the moment.

Statistics correct at 10 March 2013.

Leading goalscorers

Note: Players in bold are still eligible to play for the team at the moment.

Statistics correct at 10 March 2013.

Latest squad 
 The following players were called up for the Friendly matches.
 Match dates: 18 and 21 November 2022
 Opposition: 
Caps and goals correct as of: 27 September 2022, after the match against .

See also 
 Czech Republic men's national football team
 Czech Republic men's national under-21 football team
 Czech Republic men's national under-18 football team
 Czech Republic men's national under-17 football team
 Czech Republic women's national football team
 Czech Republic women's national under-19 football team
 Czech Republic women's national under-17 football team

References

External links
Statistics at ČMFS 
Profile at UEFA

under-19
European national under-19 association football teams
Youth football in the Czech Republic